Trio de Cologne are a classical guitar trio: either with Zoran Dukić (Croatia), Laura Young (Canada) and Pablo Márquez (Argentina), or with Zoran Dukić, Laura Young and Ceca Madzarevic.

The Trio de Cologne has performed as part of the World Guitar Ensemble.

Recordings
La Belle Excentrique. Bizet, Faure, Debussy, Satie (AS 2006 2, Al Segno, marketed by artelier media)mp3: Erik Satie - Grande Ritournellewith Dukić, Young and Madzarevic
Juegos del Viento. Stravinsky, Bogdanovic, Bartok, Hindemith, Domeniconi, Satie. (GHA 126.041, GHA Records)with Dukić, Young and Márquez

External links
Trio de Cologne - Desc.
Photos

Classical guitar ensembles